Minnesota State Highway 1 (MN 1) is a state highway across northern Minnesota, United States, which runs from North Dakota Highway 54 (ND 54) at the North Dakota state line (at the Red River in Oslo) and continues east to its eastern terminus at MN 61 at the unincorporated community of Illgen City in Beaver Bay Township on the North Shore of Lake Superior. At  in length, MN 1 is the longest state route in Minnesota.

Route description

MN 1 serves as an east–west route between Oslo, Warren, Thief River Falls, Red Lake, Northome, Cook, Tower, Ely, and Beaver Bay Township.

The roadway passes through the following forests:

 Finland State Forest in Lake County
 Superior National Forest in Lake and Saint Louis counties
 Bear Island State Forest in Lake and Saint Louis counties
 Kabetogama State Forest in Saint Louis County
 George Washington State Forest in Itasca County
 Koochiching State Forest in Koochiching County

This is the longest concurrency with another state highway within Minnesota.

History
Most of MN 1 was authorized in 1933, except for a section between U.S. Highway 75 (US 75) and MN 32 at Thief River Falls, which was part of Minnesota Constitutional Route 33 authorized in 1920.

The route was given the MN 1 designation because it was one of the longest trunk highways, and would allow re-use of the MN 1 markers removed from along US 61 and US 65 in 1934.

When it was marked in 1934, it was only paved from US 75 to MN 32 and from MN 169 to Ely.

As recently as 1963, significant portions of MN 1 were unpaved.

MN 1 still had an unpaved segment in 1996, between US 53 and MN 169 in northern Saint Louis County. At that point it was swapped with paved County Road 22.

Major intersections

See also

References

External links

 Minnesota Highway 1, MN Highway Endings.

001
Transportation in Lake County, Minnesota
Transportation in St. Louis County, Minnesota
Transportation in Itasca County, Minnesota
Transportation in Koochiching County, Minnesota
Transportation in Beltrami County, Minnesota
Transportation in Pennington County, Minnesota
Transportation in Marshall County, Minnesota
Transportation in Clearwater County, Minnesota